In chemistry, recrystallization is a technique used to purify chemicals. By dissolving a mixture of a compound and impurities in an appropriate solvent, either the desired compound or impurities can be removed from the solution, leaving the other behind. It is named for the crystals often formed when the compound precipitates out. Alternatively, recrystallization can refer to the natural growth of larger ice crystals at the expense of smaller ones.

Chemistry
In chemistry, recrystallization is a procedure for purifying compounds. The most typical situation is that a desired "compound A" is contaminated by a small amount of "impurity B". There are various methods of purification that may be attempted (see Separation process), recrystallization being one of them. There are also different recrystallization techniques that can be used such as:

Single-solvent recrystallization 
Typically, the mixture of "compound A" and "impurity B" is dissolved in the smallest amount of hot solvent to fully dissolve the mixture, thus making a saturated solution. The solution is then allowed to cool. As the solution cools the solubility of compounds in the solution drops. This results in the desired compound dropping (recrystallizing) from the solution. The slower the rate of cooling, the bigger the crystals form.

In an ideal situation the solubility product of the impurity, B, is not exceeded at any temperature. In that case, the solid crystals will consist of pure A and all the impurities will remain in the solution. The solid crystals are collected by filtration and the filtrate is discarded. If the solubility product of the impurity is exceeded, some of the impurities will co-precipitate. However, because of the relatively low concentration of the impurity, its concentration in the precipitated crystals will be less than its concentration in the original solid. Repeated recrystallization will result in an even purer crystalline precipitate. The purity is checked after each recrystallization by measuring the melting point, since impurities lower the melting point. NMR spectroscopy can also be used to check the level of impurity. Repeated recrystallization results in some loss of material because of the non-zero solubility of compound A.

The crystallization process requires an initiation step, such as the addition of a "seed" crystal. In the laboratory, a minuscule fragment of glass, produced by scratching the side of the glass recrystallization vessel, may provide the nucleus on which crystals may grow. 
Successful recrystallization depends on finding the right solvent. This is usually a combination of prediction/experience and trial/error. The compounds must be more soluble at higher temperatures than at lower temperatures. Any insoluble impurity is removed by the technique of hot filtration.

Multi-solvent recrystallization 
This method is the same as the above but where two (or more) solvents are used. This relies on both "compound A" and "impurity B" being soluble in a first solvent. A second solvent is slowly added. Either "compound A" or "impurity B" will be insoluble in this solvent and precipitate, whilst the other of "compound A"/"impurity B" will remain in solution. Thus the proportion of first and second solvents is critical. Typically the second solvent is added slowly until one of the compounds begins to crystallize from the solution and then the solution is cooled. Heating is not required for this technique but can be used.

The reverse of this method can be used where a mixture of solvents dissolves both A and B. One of the solvents is then removed by distillation or by an applied vacuum. This results in a change in the proportions of the solvent causing either "compound A" or "impurity B" to precipitate.

Hot filtration-recrystallization 
Hot filtration can be used to separate "compound A" from both "impurity B" and some "insoluble matter C". This technique normally uses a single-solvent system as described above. When both "compound A" and "impurity B" are dissolved in the minimum amount of hot solvent, the solution is filtered to remove "insoluble matter C". This matter may be anything from a third impurity compound to fragments of broken glass. For a successful procedure, one must ensure that the filtration apparatus is hot in order to stop the dissolved compounds from crystallizing from the solution during filtration, thus forming crystals on the filter paper or funnel.

One way to achieve this is to heat a conical flask containing a small amount of clean solvent on a hot plate. A filter funnel is rested on the mouth, and hot solvent vapors keep the stem warm. Jacketed filter funnels may also be used. The filter paper is preferably fluted, rather than folded into a quarter; this allows quicker filtration, thus less opportunity for the desired compound to cool and crystallize from the solution.

Often it is simpler to do the filtration and recrystallization as two independent and separate steps. That is dissolve "compound A" and "impurity B" in a suitable solvent at room temperature, filter (to remove insoluble compound/glass), remove the solvent and then recrystallize using any of the methods listed above.

Seeding 
Crystallization requires an initiation step. This can be spontaneous or can be done by adding a small amount of the pure compound (a seed crystal) to the saturated solution, or can be done by simply scratching the glass surface to create a seeding surface for crystal growth. It is thought that even dust particles can act as simple seeds.

Single perfect crystals (for X-ray analysis) 
Growing crystals for X-ray crystallography can be quite difficult. For X-ray analysis, single perfect crystals are required. Typically a small amount (5–100 mg) of a pure compound is used, and crystals are allowed to grow very slowly. Several techniques can be used to grow these perfect crystals:
 Slow evaporation of a single solvent - typically the compound is dissolved in a suitable solvent and the solvent is allowed to slowly evaporate. Once the solution is saturated crystals can be formed.

 Slow evaporation of a multi-solvent system - the same as above, however as the solvent composition changes due to evaporation of the more volatile solvent. The compound is more soluble in the volatile solvent, and so the compound becomes increasingly insoluble in solution and crystallizes.

 Slow diffusion - similar to the above. However, a second solvent is allowed to evaporate from one container into a container holding the compound solution (gas diffusion). As the solvent composition changes due to an increase in the solvent that has gas diffused into the solution, the compound becomes increasingly insoluble in the solution and crystallizes.

 Interface/slow mixing (often performed in an NMR tube). Similar to the above, but instead of one solvent gas-diffusing into another, the two solvents mix (diffuse) by liquid-liquid diffusion. Typically a second solvent is "layered" carefully on top of the solution containing the compound. Over time the two solution mix. As the solvent composition changes due to diffusion, the compound becomes increasingly insoluble in solution and crystallizes, usually at the interface. Additionally, it is better to use a denser solvent as the lower layer, and/or a hotter solvent as the upper layer because this results in the slower mixing of the solvents.

 Specialized equipment can be used in the shape of an "H" to perform the above, where one of the vertical lines of the "H" is a tube containing a solution of the compound, and the other vertical line of the "H" is a tube containing a solvent which the compound is not soluble in, and the horizontal line of the "H" is a tube which joins the two vertical tubes, which also has a fine glass sinter that restricts the mixing of the two solvents.

 Once single perfect crystals have been obtained, it is recommended that the crystals are kept in a sealed vessel with some of the liquid of crystallization to prevent the crystal from 'drying out'. Single perfect crystals may contain solvent of crystallization in the crystal lattice. Loss of this internal solvent from the crystals can result in the crystal lattice breaking down, and the crystals turning to powder.

Ice
For ice, recrystallization refers to the growth of larger crystals at the expense of smaller ones. Some biological antifreeze proteins have been shown to inhibit this process, and the effect may be relevant in freezing-tolerant organisms.

See also
 Craig tube, an apparatus for small-scale recrystallization
 Crystal structure
 Crystallization
 Fractional crystallization (chemistry)
 Laser-heated pedestal growth
 Seed crystal
 Single crystal

References

Reference books 
 
 

Chemical processes
Laboratory techniques
Phase transitions
Separation processes
Semiconductor growth